Caplan is a surname. Notable people with the surname include:

Amanita Caplan, Sense8 character
Arthur Caplan, American bioethicist
Bryan Caplan (born 1971), American economist
David Caplan (born 1964), Canadian politician
Elinor Caplan (1944-2019), Canadian politician
Frank Caplan (1911–1988), American toymaker
Fred H. Caplan (1914–2004), West Virginia Supreme Court Justice
Gerald Caplan (born 1938), Canadian political academic
Irwin Caplan (1919–2007), American cartoonist 
Lizzy Caplan (born 1982), American actress
Melvyn Caplan, British Conservative politician
Ralph Caplan (born 1925), American design consultant
Twink Caplan, American actress

See also
Kaplan (disambiguation)
Kaplan (surname)

Jewish surnames
Kohenitic surnames
Yiddish-language surnames